However U Want It is the debut studio album by American hip hop recording artist Emcee N.I.C.E. former Lead Vocalist/Rapper of the Urban Rock group KansasCali. The album features the single "Tonight" feat. Suhana Machete in which stayed on the Billboard Hot Single Sales chart for 13 weeks. The album also features 13 more songs with contributions from Grammy nominated and award-winning writers and producers along with a bonus track.

Background
In 2012, Emcee N.I.C.E. revealed plans for his debut studio album during an interview with the Las Vegas Informer Magazine  he was quoted as saying "The reason I wanted to do this album, was to bring fun back to music"... Then, original title for the album was "Way Back Now" that paid homage to the old school way of Hip-Hop music with the new school delivery.

The anticipation for the album picked up when (Actress/Fox News Correspondent) Stacey Dash was featured on a dance track entitled Life of The Party. The song received high praise from Russell Simmons Global Grind, saying that “Even though Emcee N.I.C.E. who is really Nice on the mic isn’t a household name as of yet, he soon will be.”. Media giant TMZ's TooFab exclusively debuted the music video and the album was slated to make a big impact. However Stacey Dash political support for Mitt Romney and statements against President Barack Obama caused a stir among the African American community and the backlash from it caused the public to turn on anything she was a part of, even though Emcee N.I.C.E. wasn't involved and due to the backlash the label and distributors postponed the release date.

In October 2014 Emcee N.I.C.E. without fan fair and a lot of hype, would go on to release the second single from the album entitled "Tonight" feat. Suhana Machete. The single would gain momentum spending 13 weeks from November 1, 2014 - February 2015 peaking at #8 on the US Billboard Hot Single Sales Chart in 2014 (Billboard Albums). During the production of the album N.I.C.E. would change the title of the album to reflect the direction of music in which was geared towards women and entitled it "However U Want It"

Track listing 

Sample credits
"I Got U Baby" contains a sample of the song "Backstrokin" performed by Fatback Band.

Singles 
Tonight feat. Suhana Machete peaked at #8 on the US Billboard Hot Single Sales Chart in 2014 (Billboard Albums)  The single

Chart History

Personnel 

Emcee N.I.C.E. — executive producer, primary artist
Suhana Machete — primary artist
Natasha Marie — primary artist
Manny B — primary artist
Jus Blake — primary artist
Dennis Bettis — primary artist
Emanuel Officer — primary artist
Jakkai Butler — primary artist
D.B.I. — primary artist
Dennis Lorenzo — primary artist
Kelly Keys — producer
DJ Fat Jack— producer
Ralph B. Stacy aka "Phantom — producer, bass, guitar
Shawn "J" Jaros— producer

Frank DeRozan— executive producer
Chantal Grayson — executive producer
BJ Luster — executive producer
De'Jon J.H. Clark — co-executive producer
Jzhamael Kebulon Ashantee— executive
Maisha "Mrald" Johnson — background vocals
Laskey B — background vocals
Jon Barnes — trumpet
Will Togba— writer (track #4)
Earl "Slick TwoThree" Barlow— writer (track #4)
Brandino — bass
Dan "Deezy" Naim— head engineer, mixer
Thomas "Tomcat" Bennett Jr.— engineer
Eric Labson - mastering

Release history

References

External links 

Itunes.apple.com

2015 albums